Naupada is a village located in Santha Bommali mandal of Srikakulam district near to major town palasa, Andhra Pradesh, India. It is famous for salt fields and called the "Salt Bowl of Andhra Pradesh". It is better known for its railway junction station.

Geography
Naupada is located at 18.5667N 84.3E. It has an average elevation of 5 metre (19 ft).

Transport
Naupada railway station is 2 km from Naupada village. It is a railway junction on the Howrah-Chennai main line and express trains halt here. Naupada-Gunupur branch line was converted in 2011 from narrow gauge to   broad gauge.

References

External links
 History of Naupada-Gunupur railway

Villages in Srikakulam district